The Nee-Tahi-Buhn Band is a First Nation located in the Interior of British Columbia near Burns Lake.

Governance
Nee-Tahi-Buhn is a section 11 First Nations band that uses a custom electoral system. The current council was appointed on December 12, 2018, with the exception of Councillor Tyson Lee Prince, who was appointed on October 18, 2019. The current council's term will expire on December 11, 2022.

Treaty Process

History

Demographics
Reserve number: 726 
Number of Band Members: 133

List of Reserves

 Eastern Island 13
 Francois Lake 7
 Isaac (Gale Lake) 8
 Omineca 1
 Uncha Lake 13A

Economic Development

Social, Educational and Cultural Programs and Facilities

References

Dakelh governments
Omineca Country